Tikkana (or Tikkana Somayaji) (1205–1288) was a 13th century Telugu poet. Born into a Telugu-speaking Niyogi Brahmin family during the golden age of the Kakatiya dynasty, he was the second poet of the "Trinity of Poets (Kavi Trayam)" that translated Mahabharata into Telugu. Nannaya Bhattaraka, the first, translated two and a half chapters of Mahabharata. Tikkana translated the final 15 chapters, but did not undertake translating the half-finished Aranya Parvamu. The Telugu people remained without this last translation for more than a century, until it was translated by Errana.

Tikkana is also called Tikkana Somayaji, as he completed the Somayaga. Tikkana's titles were Kavibrahma and Ubhaya Kavi Mitrudu.

Religious conflict
Tikkana was born in 1205 in Patur village, Kovur, Nellore district during the Golden Age of the Kakatiya dynasty. During this time conflict occurred between the two sects of Sanātana Dharma, Shaivism and Vaishnavism. Tikkana attempted to bring peace to the warring Shivaites and Vaishnavites.

Political situation

Tikkana was a minister of the Nellore Choda ruler Manuma-siddhi II. In 1248, Manuma-siddhi II faced multiple rebellions, and lost control of his capital. He faced Tikkana as an emissary to the court of his overlord, the Kakatiya king Ganapati-deva. Ganapati received Tikkana warmly, and sent an army that re-established Manuma-siddhi II on the throne of Nellore.

Tikkana dedicated his first literary work Nirvachanottara Ramayanamu, to Ganapati-deva. In this work he narrated the later part of Ramayanamu, the story of Sita's banishment to the forests and the birth of Lava and Kusa. Later, Tikkana translated the Mahabharatamu and dedicated it to Hariharanadha.

Writing style
His writing style was mostly Telugu, unlike Nannayya whose work was mostly sanskritized. Tikkana used Telugu words even to express very difficult ideas. He used Telugu words and parables extensively.

In the colophons of his work, Tikkana calls himself "a friend to both [kinds of] poets" (Ubhaya-kavi-mitra). The meaning of this phrase is not clear: it may refer to Sanskrit and Telugu poets; or Shaivite and non-Shaivite poets; or Brahmin and non-Brahmin poets; or folk poets and scholarly poets.

Examples
The flavor of Telugu similes spice up his poetry:
 madugu cheerayandu masi thaakinatlu- as if pure white cheera (sari) is touched by soot, 
 paalalo padina balli vidhambuna-like the lizard in the milk, 
 neyyivosina yagni bhangi- like the fire in which neyyi (clarified butter) was poured, 
 mantalo midutalu chochchinatlayina- fate of locusts flew into the fire, 
 kantikin reppayu bole- like the eyelid for the eye, 
 noothi kappa vidhambuna- like a frog in the well

Philosophy
During the reign of Emperor Ganapatideva, Shaivites, Vaishnvites and Jains had meetings to discuss different philosophies. Tikkana participated in those religious meetings and defeated the Buddhist and Jain participants and established Hinduism. During this time he proposed the unity of God. He preached that Lord Shiva (Hara) and Lord Vishnu (Hari) were one and that the apparent differences in names were made up and were untrue. This philosophy is known as "Hariharaadvaitamu (the Unity of Hari and Hara)Hariharaanadhudu called him Thikka Sharma please dedicate to me." To firmly establish this principle, Tikkana translated Mahabharatamu into Telugu. This was a great contribution to the peace and unity of Telugus.

Other works
Tikkana's other literary contributions include Vijayasenamu, Kavivaagbandhamu, Krishnasatakamu, etc. Though he was second to Nannayya in attempting to translate Mahabharatamu and second poet among the Trinity of Poets, he is second to none in his political, religious and literary accomplishments.

Legacy and depictions in popular culture
The 15th or 16th century poet Nutana-kavi Suranna claimed descent from Tikkana.

There is a library named after him in Guntur. It is maintained by a committee headed by Machiraju Sitapati and Kurakula Guraviah, an ex-corporator. In 2013 they celebrated 100 years of the library's functioning.
There was a television series made on the life of Tikkana.

See also

 Kavitrayam
 Telugu literature

References

Bibliography 

 

Telugu poets
Telugu writers
1205 births
1288 deaths
13th-century Indian poets
People from Nellore
Indian male poets
Poets from Andhra Pradesh
13th-century Indian translators
Sanskrit–Telugu translators